Martyr was a Canadian death metal band from Trois-Rivières, Québec. Their musical style consisted of mostly progressive use of melodics and variations of thrash and death metal influences.

History 

Formed in 1994 by brothers Daniel (guitar, vocals) and François Mongrain (bass), along with Pier-Luc Lampron (guitar) and François Richard (drums), Martyr recorded a demo tape in September 1995 titled Ostrogoth. In September 1997, the drummer François Richard left the band being replaced by Patrice Hamelin, the full-length debut Hopeless Hopes was self-released in November that same year.

Martyr independently released their second album, Warp Zone, in 2000. Lampron had left the band and was replaced on the guitar by Martin Carbonneau.

In 2007 the band released an album, Feeding the Abscess.  In 2008 the band released a video, Havoc in Quebec City.

Daniel Mongrain joined Voivod in 2008, under the nickname "Chewy".

Members
 Daniel Mongrain (1994–2012) - guitar, vocals
 Martin Carbonneau (2002–2012) - guitar
 François Mongrain (1994–2012) - bass, backing vocals
 Pier-Luc Lampron (1994–2001) - guitar
 François Richard (1994–1997) - drums
 Patrice Hamelin (1997–2012) - drums

Timeline

Discography

 Hopeless Hopes (1997)
 Warp Zone (2000)
 Feeding the Abscess (2006)

Live albums
 Extracting the Core (2001)

Video albums
 Havoc in Quebec City (2008)

References

External links 
 

Canadian technical death metal musical groups
Musical groups established in 1994
English-language musical groups from Quebec
Trois-Rivières
1994 establishments in Quebec